Lee Mendelson Film Productions is an American animation studio situated in Burlingame, California founded by Lee Mendelson. The studio is best known for the Peanuts animated film productions including Snoopy, Come Home and A Boy Named Charlie Brown.

Filmography

Television series

Feature films

See also
Peanuts filmography
Melendez Films

References

American animation studios
Entertainment companies based in California
Companies based in Burlingame, California
Entertainment companies established in 1989
1989 establishments in California